Mahika Sharma is an Indian actress. She won a beauty pageant, becoming the Miss Teen Northeast. She has also appeared in Indian television serials.

Sharma has appeared in television show F.I.R. (TV series) and Bollywood movie Mr Joe B. Carvalho.

Philanthropy
Sharma has helped in a sex workers' rehab programme. She is also working for the state to develop its culture and tradition.

Filmography
Mr Joe B. Carvalho
Mardaani
Ramayan
The Suite Life of Karan & Kabir
Tu Mere Agal Bagal Hai
F.I.R.
Chalo Dilli
Mon Jaai 2008 Assamese Film

References

External links

 
 
 
 

21st-century Indian actresses
Actresses in Assamese cinema
Actresses in Hindi television
Indian film actresses
Indian television actresses
Indian soap opera actresses
Living people
Actresses from Assam
Female models from Assam
Place of birth missing (living people)
1994 births